Charles M. Silver is an American lawyer, currently the Roy W. and Eugenia C. McDonald Endowed Chair in Civil Procedure, and previously the W. James Kronzer Chair and Cecil D. Redford Professor at University of Texas School of Law.

Education
JD Yale University
MA University of Chicago
BA University of Florida

References

Year of birth missing (living people)
Living people
University of Texas at Austin faculty
American lawyers
Yale Law School alumni
University of Chicago alumni
University of Florida alumni